MOOD is a hip hop group based in Cincinnati, Ohio, United States, composed of rappers Main Flow, Donte, and record producer Jahson. Originally formed under the name of Three Below Zero, they wound up changing their name to Mood in 1994. They first came to prominence with the Hi-Tek produced single "Hustle on the Side" in 1996. Their 1997 album Doom featured production by a young Hi-Tek and a guest appearance by Talib Kweli.

In 2000, they appeared on "Mission Control Presents", a compilation which featured acts associated with producer Jahson and his record label Mission Control. There were three Mood tracks and three tracks that featured Mood as part of a larger group called Elite Terrorist. Main Flow and Donte are also featured individually on a number of tracks.

Music videos for hit songs "Hustle On The Side" and "Karma" were produced and aired worldwide. Most notably winning awards on regional and international video programs Video Music Box, Urban Reality, Rap City and DrunkinStyle TV.

In 2011, Mood released their long-awaited follow up to Doom, entitled Live Again. In the interim, Jahson has an album out as does Main Flow (entitled Flow Season along with 7L), Donte is also planning a solo release.

Discography

Mood 
Doom (1997)
Mission Control Presents: Prehistoric Sounds feat. Mood (2000)
Live Again (2011)
Into The Mood (with Mil Beats) (2015)
Mood – Unreleased 93-95 (2016)

Main Flow 
Castle Diplomat (2001)
Hip-Hopulation (2004)
Notebook Assassins (2005)
Flow Season (with 7L) (2006)
Return of the Castle (2010)
"The Cincinnati Kid" (2014)
"Sound Of Silence" (with Mil Beats) (2018)

Donte 
Aka
“Donte The Gr8”

”TayDilla” (2018)
Full LP produced by Legendary hiphop producer “J-Dilla”

”Planet Chaos”
Full LP (2022)
“Donte The Gr8 & Speed Walton” Are
“Space Invadaz”

”Donte Presents
Nasty Boys”
Full LP
(2007) featuring various artist

"The Human Element" (with Reflection Eternal) (2000)

The Flowfessionals 
Main Flow Presents: The Flowfessionals (2005)

References 

American hip hop groups
Midwest hip hop groups
Rappers from Cincinnati